Montreal Forum is a historic building located facing Cabot Square in Montreal, Quebec, Canada. Called "the most storied building in hockey history" by Sporting News, it was an indoor arena which served as the home of the National Hockey League's Montreal Maroons from 1924 to 1938 and the Montreal Canadiens from 1926 to 1996. The Forum was built by the Canadian Arena Company in 159 days. Today most of the Forum building is now a multiplex cinema at first as AMC Forum managed by AMC Theatres and later by Cineplex Entertainment as Cineplex Cinemas Forum.

Located at the northeast corner of Atwater and Ste-Catherine West (Metro Atwater), the building was historically significant as it was home to 15 Stanley Cup championships: twelve for the Canadiens and one for the Maroons (for whom the arena was originally built); one for the visiting New York Rangers and Calgary Flames respectively. The Forum was also home to the Montreal Roadrunners and Montreal Junior Canadiens.

History

The idea to build the Forum in 1923 is credited to Sir Edward Wentworth Beatty, president of the Canadian Pacific Railway. At the suggestion of Senator Donat Raymond, William Northey developed a plan for a 12,500 seat capacity rink. Plans were scaled back for financial reasons to a rink of 9,300 seats. Even at the reduced size, the rink could not immediately find financing. The Forum would eventually be financed by H. L. Timmins. The site selected was the site of a roller skating rink named the Forum, and the name was kept. The site had previously been the site of an outdoor ice hockey rink, used by Frank and Lester Patrick, Art Ross and Russell Bowie as youths.

The Forum opened on November 29, 1924, at a total cost of 1.5 million ($ in  dollars) with an original seating capacity of 9,300. It underwent two renovations, in 1949 and 1968. When the Forum closed in 1996 it had a capacity of 17,959, which included approximately 1,600 in standing room.

By the time of the 1968 renovations, a centre hanging digital scoreclock was installed, designed by the Day Sign Company of Toronto and similar to those installed at the Boston Garden and Chicago Stadium during the 1970s. A new centre hanging scoreclock, designed by Daktronics, was installed in 1985 and contained on each side a color matrix board. Along with one other Original Six indoor ice hockey arena, the Boston Garden, the Montreal Forum used a high-pitched siren to signal the end of an NHL game's period — the siren would later be re-installed in the Forum's successor facility, the Bell Centre (and still in use there), much as the TD Garden in Boston inherited the lower-pitched Garden's siren. A Rainforest Cafe was planned to open at the location following its closure, but was never built.

Ice hockey

While hosting the Canadiens and Maroons on Thursdays and Saturdays, the Forum also hosted the Quebec Senior Hockey League, featuring the Montreal Victorias, Montreal Royals and the Montreal Canadiens amateur team on Wednesdays and Sundays. The Quebec Junior Hockey League played on Monday nights, the Bank League on Tuesdays and the Railways and Telephone League played on Friday nights.

The Montreal Forum hosted Memorial Cup games in 1950, 1968, 1969, 1970, 1973 & 1976, with the Junior Canadiens winning on home ice in 1970. In 1972, the Forum hosted game one of the famous "Summit Series" between Team Canada and the USSR, the USSR won the game 7-3. The 1980 NHL Entry Draft was hosted at the Forum. It would mark the first time that an NHL Arena hosted the event.

The Forum hosted the Stanley Cup Final in 1926, 1928, 1930, 1931, 1944, 1946, 1947, 1951, 1952, 1953, 1954, 1955, 1956, 1957, 1958, 1959, 1960, 1965, 1966, 1967, 1968, 1969, 1971, 1973, 1976, 1977, 1978, 1979, 1986, 1989, and 1993.

Only two visiting teams have ever won the Stanley Cup on Forum ice: the New York Rangers did so in 1928, defeating the Maroons, while the Calgary Flames defeated the Canadiens in 1989.

On March 11, 1996, the Montreal Canadiens played their last game at the Montreal Forum, defeating the Dallas Stars 4-1. The game was televised on TSN and TQS in Canada, and on ESPN2 in the United States. The Stars' Guy Carbonneau, who had captained the Canadiens from 1989 to 1994 (including their 1993 Cup win), took the ceremonial opening faceoff. After the game, many previous hockey greats were presented to the crowd, most notably Maurice Richard (said to be the Canadiens' most beloved player of all time), who received a sixteen-minute standing ovation from the crowd as he broke down in tears. A symbolic torch—representative of a line quoted from the poem In Flanders Fields, "To you from failing hands we throw the torch; be yours to hold it high," displayed in the Forum's home dressing room—was carried by Emile Bouchard out of the Canadiens dressing room to the playing surface. The flaming torch was passed on to each of the former Canadiens captains (Jean Beliveau, Yvan Cournoyer, Henri Richard, Serge Savard, Bob Gainey, and Carbonneau), and finally to the then-current captain Pierre Turgeon. The next day, a parade was organized in which the torch was carried down the route to the Molson Centre (which has since been renamed the Bell Centre). Their first game at the new venue was against the New York Rangers, a game which the Canadiens won.

Other sports
The Forum also hosted other sports, including indoor soccer, boxing, lacrosse and tennis. The Forum was a site of five events in the 1976 Summer Olympics: gymnastics, handball (final), basketball (final), volleyball (final), and boxing (final). The gymnastics event included Nadia Comaneci's famous perfect 10, the first in Olympic history.

The Forum was the site of many major professional wrestling matches, as shown in the 1961 National Film Board of Canada documentary Wrestling (La Lutte).

Notable events

On March 11, 1937, the Forum hosted its only funeral, for Canadiens great Howie Morenz. Morenz died from complications due to a broken leg, sustained in a game between the Canadiens and the Chicago Blackhawks on January 28.

On September 8, 1964, The Beatles performed at the Forum. Four tracks including a live version of "A Hard Rain's a-Gonna Fall" for The Bootleg Series Vol. 5: Bob Dylan Live 1975, The Rolling Thunder Revue were recorded here. Bob Marley and the Wailers played here on June 10, 1978 to support his Kaya Tour. The Bee Gees played two sold-out concerts here on September 1–2, 1979 during their North American Spirits Having Flown Tour. The first four tracks off the Journey live album Captured were recorded at The Forum on August 8, 1980. In 1981, Canadian rock band Rush filmed (and recorded almost all of) their 1981 concert film and album, Exit...Stage Left. That same year, British rock band Queen recorded and filmed their concert film, titled We Will Rock You (re-released as Queen Rock Montreal in 2007), by performing the final two concerts of The Game Tour there. This had followed earlier performances by the band in 1977 for the A Day At The Races Tour, 1978 for the Jazz Tour, 1980 for the first leg of The Game Tour, and finally in 1982 for the Hot Space Tour. On August 4, 1981, the Jacksons performed at the Forum during their Triumph Tour. In March 1983, American musical duo Hall & Oates filmed and recorded their concert film, Rock 'n Soul Live. The live portions of Black Sabbath's video for the song "Zero the Hero" were filmed in 1983. July 7–8 Madonna with her Who's That Girl World Tour for two sold-out concerts. In July 1983, David Bowie held a concert for his Serious Moonlight Tour to promote his new album Let's Dance. As part of her debut headlining tour, The Greatest Love World Tour, Whitney Houston performed a concert on August 6, 1986.

The heavy metal band Metallica performed two half-priced shows at the Montreal Forum in February 1993 after the events of August 1992.

Billy Graham held his Mission Quebec in 1990, before nearly 20,000 spectators, which was filmed for international television syndication as a TV special. Then Canadien Ryan Walter delivered his testimony at the crusade.

Seating capacity

After hockey

After the Canadiens left the Forum, the building was used to film arena sequences for the Brian De Palma film Snake Eyes. It was then completely gutted and converted into a downtown entertainment centre called the Pepsi Forum, consisting of an AMC Theatres multiplex theatre (sold to Cineplex Odeon in July 2012), shops and restaurants. Centre ice has been recreated in the centre of the complex complete with a small section of the grandstand, along with a statue of a fan leaning forward in delight (removed in the summer of 2017), while original seats are used as benches throughout the complex. A statue of Maurice Richard is located next to the grandstand. On the Saint Catherine Street entrance there is a Quebec Walk of Fame consisting of Richard and Celine Dion. Both were on hand for their bronze star's respective unveiling. The Atwater street entrance has a large bronze Montreal Canadiens logo surrounded by 24 bronze Stanley Cup banners cemented into the sidewalk. Inscribed in French are the words "forever proud". The entire building is themed after the Forum's storied history with special emphasis on the Montreal Canadiens.

The building was declared a National Historic Site of Canada in 1997 because: 

The city of Montreal estimates the value of the building at $36.8 million, in 2012. This is a $10 million drop in value since the previous estimation in 2009. AMC Forum is now owned by New York City-based real estate investor Ben Ashkenazy through a firm called Investissements Forum Canadien Inc.

References

External links
Came, Barry. "Farewell to the Montreal Forum" Maclean's Magazine, January 17, 2003.
 RinkAtlas listing for Montreal Forum

Venues of the 1976 Summer Olympics
Defunct indoor arenas in Canada
Defunct indoor ice hockey venues in Canada
Defunct National Hockey League venues
Defunct volleyball venues
Downtown Montreal
Former music venues in Canada
Music venues in Montreal
National Historic Sites in Quebec
Olympic basketball venues
Olympic boxing venues
Olympic gymnastics venues
Olympic handball venues
Olympic volleyball venues
Ontario Hockey League arenas
PepsiCo buildings and structures
Quebec Major Junior Hockey League arenas
Rebuilt buildings and structures in Canada
Sports venues completed in 1924
Sports venues demolished in 1998
Forum
North American Soccer League (1968–1984) indoor venues
Basketball venues in Quebec
Volleyball venues in Canada
 
Boxing venues in Quebec
Indoor soccer venues
1924 establishments in Quebec
1996 disestablishments in Quebec
Defunct sports venues in Canada
Demolished buildings and structures in Montreal
Demolished sports venues
Indoor ice hockey venues in Quebec
Montreal Canadiens
Montreal Maroons